Qiji is a town in Panji District, Huainan, Anhui. , it administers the following three residential communities and five villages:
Qiji Community
Qiwei Community
Caogang Community
Chenhu Village
Chenying Village
Quanqiao Village
Huanggang Village
Xugang Village

References

Panji District
Township-level divisions of Anhui